Rocket Robin Hood is a Canadian animated television series, placing the characters and conflicts of the classic Robin Hood legend in a futuristic, outer space setting. It was produced by Krantz Films, Inc. and aired on CBC Television from 1966 to 1969.

Summary

Rocket Robin Hood leads his "Merry Men"—including the strong, dimwitted and likeable Little John; consummate overeater, Friar Tuck (who designs all of the Merry Men's weaponry); his two-fisted, red-headed cousin Will Scarlet; Robin's plucky girlfriend Maid Marian; his sharp-witted right-hand man Alan-a-Dale; scrawny and feisty camp cook Giles (a reformed crook and Gabby Hayes-type); and other characters from the classic story of Robin Hood. They live in "the astonishing year 3000" on New Sherwood Forest Asteroid and are determined to foil the despotic plans of Prince John and his bumbling lackey, the Sheriff of N.O.T.T. (National Outer-space Terrestrial Territories) and other villains such as Dr. Medulla, Manta, Nocturne and the Warlord of Saturn. Rocket Robin Hood and his merry men fly in spaceships and use weapons such as "electro-quarterstaffs".

Each 22-minute episode is divided into three segments, with cliffhangers between the first and second part and the second and third part. All episodes also feature short vignettes of the various characters.

A male chorus sang the opening and closing themes for each of the three seasons in the style of traditional old English ballads.

Voice cast
Carl Banas as Titanor / Dr. Manta
Len Birman as Rocket Robin Hood
Chris Wiggins as Will Scarlet / Infinata / Baron Blank
Bernard Cowan as Narrator
Ed McNamara as Little John
Paul Kligman as Friar Tuck
Gillie Fenwick as the Sheriff of N.O.T.T.
John Scott as Prince John

Background

Rocket Robin Hood was produced and animated at Trillium Productions, an animation studio that was part of the Guest Group—a creative group of companies owned by producer Al Guest. One of the key animators was Jean Mathieson, one of the first female animators in Canada, who later formed Rainbow Animation in Canada and Magic Shadows Inc in the U.S. with Guest, where they continued to produce animated TV programming.

Background designer Richard H. Thomas joined the group late in the second season and brought a dark, almost psychedelic feel to the production under Associate Producer for Krantz Films Ralph Bakshi, who would later become a well known animation producer and would be responsible for, among other series, the animated film versions of Fritz the Cat and The Lord of the Rings. Third-season episodes were animated at Ralph's Spot in New York City, although voices continued to be recorded in Toronto. One of the show's chief designers during this time was science fiction illustrator/comic book artist Gray Morrow.

Bernard Cowan was the show's narrator. Paul Kligman, who voiced J. Jonah Jameson in the 1960s animated version of Spider-Man, was the voice of Friar Tuck. Len Birman, who appeared in the movies Silver Streak (1976) and Bayo (1985), was the voice of Rocket Robin Hood. Len Carlson subbed for Birman as Rocket Robin Hood in some third season episodes. Carl Banas was the voice of Titanor / Dr. Manta. Ed McNamara provided the voice of Little John. Chris Wiggins was the voice of Will Scarlet.

There was also a French version titled Robin Fusée, broadcast on French-language television in Canada.

Episodes

Pilot

Season 1

Season 2

Season 3

Broadcast 
In Canada, the show aired on Toronto's CITY-TV in the 1970s and 1980s, as well as CHEX-TV in Peterborough and on CJOH-TV in the Ottawa area. On some occasions, reruns of the show would air in the early morning hours on Teletoon during the 2000s. 

In Japan, the series was dubbed by Transglobal and it aired on Fuji TV and other FNS stations from May 1, 1971 to circa 1972. The series was last aired on Nippon TV via おーい!まんがだヨー block in circa 1973. In Hong Kong and Macau, the show aired on Rediffusion Television titled  (Robin Hood in Space), it aired from December 3, 1979, to December 28, 1979. Later, the show was reaired from December 28, 1980, to January 17, 1982, on the same network.

In the UK, the series aired on ITV and it's various regional stations from 1968 with regular repeat runs throughout the 70s and early 80s until 1983.

Currently, the series airs on the RetroTV digital subchannel network in the United States.

DVD release
E1 Entertainment released Volume 1, which contains almost all of season 1, in November 2009 as a four-DVD set (English and French versions, 592 minutes). E1 stated that the episode "Safari" was not included due to unavailable footage.

Volume 2, which encompasses all of seasons 2 and 3, was released in May 2010 also as a four-DVD set (English and French versions, 714 minutes).  The French versions of these DVD collections are available separately as Robin fusée.

References

External links

Rocket Robin Hood at Don Markstein's Toonopedia. Archived from the original on January 19, 2017.
In Search Of...Rocket Robin Hood  at The Nice Rooms e-zine

1960s Canadian animated television series
Canadian children's animated science fiction television series
Canadian children's animated space adventure television series
Canadian children's animated superhero television series
Television series created by Ralph Bakshi
Robin Hood television series
1966 Canadian television series debuts
1969 Canadian television series endings
First-run syndicated television shows in Canada
First-run syndicated television programs in the United States
Space pirates
Television series set in the 4th millennium
History of Canada (1960–1981)
Television series by Grantray-Lawrence Animation